is a village located in Nakaniikawa District, Toyama Prefecture, Japan.

Geography
Funahashi is located in central Toyama Prefecture.

Surrounding municipalities
Toyama Prefecture
 Toyama
 Kamiichi
 Tateyama

Climate
The town has a Humid subtropical climate (Köppen Cfa) characterized by hot summers and cold winters with heavy snowfall. The average annual temperature in Funahashi is 13.9 °C. The average annual rainfall is 2306 mm with September as the wettest month. The temperatures are highest on average in August, at around 26.4 °C, and lowest in January, at around 2.6 °C.

Demographics
Per Japanese census data, the population of Funahashi has more than doubled over the past 30 years.

History
The area of present-day Funahashi was part of ancient Etchū Province. The modern village of Funahashi was created with the establishment of the municipalities system on April 1, 1889. Funahashi is the only village left in Toyama prefecture, after any other villages were merged with towns or cities.

Economy
Agriculture (rice, edamame, acorn squash) was traditionally the mainstay of the local economy; however, the village has increasingly become a bedroom community for nearby Toyama.

Education
Funahashi has one public elementary school and one public middle school operated by the village government. The village does not have a high school.

Transportation

Railway
Toyama Chihō Railway Main Line

Highway
 The village is not on any national highway or expressway

References

External links

  

 
Villages in Toyama Prefecture